The 2016 QBE Insurance Australian FIM Speedway Grand Prix was the eleventh and final race of the 2016 Speedway Grand Prix season. It took place on 22 October at the Etihad Stadium in Melbourne, Australia.

Riders 
The Speedway Grand Prix Commission nominated reigning Australian Champion Brady Kurtz as the wild card, with newly crowned Under-21 World Champion Max Fricke and Jack Holder, the younger brother of Chris Holder, as the Track Reserves. Second series reserve Michael Jepsen Jensen replaced injured Australian Jason Doyle, while 2016 Australian Championship runner-up Sam Masters replaced the man who he had clashed with in the 2015 event, injured triple World Champion Nicki Pedersen.

Results 
The Grand Prix was won by Australia's Chris Holder, who beat Tai Woffinden, Bartosz Zmarzlik and Antonio Lindbäck in the final. It was Holder's first SGP win of the season, and his first win in SGP since winning in Great Britain in his championship year of 2012. Holder's win also saw him overtake fellow Australian Jason Doyle for overall 4th place in the series. Greg Hancock was crowned world champion for the fourth time when he won heat four. Hancock would later cause controversy by pulling out of the meeting after he was excluded from 2nd place in heat nine. Woffinden finished second in the overall standings by claiming second place, with Zmarzlik and Holder in third and fourth respectively. The meeting also saw Piotr Pawlicki Jr., Lindbäck and Niels Kristian Iversen claim the final qualifying places for the 2017 season.

Heat details

Final classification

References

See also 
 motorcycle speedway

Australia
Speedway Grand Prix